The Women's BMX 20" wheel event at the 2010 South American Games was held on March 18.  The qualifications started at 9:15 and the Final at 10:50.

Medalists

Results

Qualification

Heat 1

Heat 2

Final

References
Qualification
Final

Cycling at the 2010 South American Games
South